Justine Henin-Hardenne defeated Mary Pierce in the final, 6–1, 6–1 to win the women's singles tennis title at the 2005 French Open. It was her second French Open title, and her first of three consecutive French Open titles. Henin became the second woman in the Open Era to win the title after saving a match point, doing so in the fourth round against Svetlana Kuznetsova (the first to do so being Anastasia Myskina the previous year, against the same opponent in the same round).

Myskina was the defending champion, but lost in the first round to María Sánchez Lorenzo. Myskina became the first French Open champion to lose in the first round of her title defense.

This was the first French Open in which future champion Ana Ivanovic competed in the main draw. In just her second major main draw appearance, she reached the quarterfinals, losing to Nadia Petrova.

Seeds

Qualifying

Draw

Finals

Top half

Section 1

Section 2

Section 3

Section 4

Bottom half

Section 5

Section 6

Section 7

Section 8

Championship match statistics

References

External links
WTA Draw
2005 French Open – Women's draws and results at the International Tennis Federation

Women's Singles
French Open by year – Women's singles
French Open - Women's Singles
French Open – singles
French Open – singles